James Buchanan High School is a small, rural public high school. The school is located in Mercersburg, Pennsylvania and is part of the Tuscarora School District. James Buchanan High School was named after the 15th president of the United States, James Buchanan. In 2013, enrollment was reported as 785 pupils in 9th through 12th grades. The school employed 48 teachers.

Extracurriculars
Tuscarora School District offers a wide variety of clubs, activities and an extensive sports program.

Sports
The district funds:

Boys
Baseball - AAA
Basketball- AAA
Cross country - AA
Football - AAA
Golf - AAA
Soccer - AA
Swimming and diving - AA
Tennis - AA
Track and field - AAA
Wrestling - AAA

Girls
Basketball - AAA
Cross country - AA
Golf - AAA
Soccer - AA
Softball - AAA
Swimming and diving - AA
Tennis - AA
Track and field - AA
Volleyball -AA

According to PIAA directory July 2013

References

Public high schools in Pennsylvania
Schools in Franklin County, Pennsylvania